Florence Airport, Peretola ,  and formally Amerigo Vespucci Airport, is the international airport of Florence, the capital of the Italian region of Tuscany. It is the second-busiest Tuscan airport in terms of passengers after Pisa International Airport.

History

Early years
The first air field in Florence was created in the Campo di Marte area in 1910, when military authorities allowed a field to be used for "experiments in air navigation". Campo di Marte thus became Florence's first airport, and remained so throughout the 1920s. However, the field was soon surrounded by houses and was inadequate for the new aircraft that were then replacing the first canvas-covered craft. In 1928, a location on the plain between Florence and Sesto Fiorentino was chosen. Peretola Airport opened there on 4 June 1931.

At first, Peretola was a large field where airplanes took off and landed with no formal direction, but eventually, the Ministry of Aeronautics decided to enlarge and upgrade it. The airport was extended toward Castello, and in 1938–39, an asphalt runway 60 metres wide and 1,000 metres long, facing northeast, was built.

During World War II, Peretola was used both by the Royal Italian Air Force and the Luftwaffe and from 1944 by Allied air forces. Then later in the 1940s it welcomed its first passenger flights, operated by Aerea Teseo with Douglas DC-3 aircraft. In 1948, Aerea Teseo went out of business. In the late '50s and early '60s, Alitalia, also using the DC-3, offered two routes: Rome–Florence–Venice and Rome–Florence–Milan. ATI then offered several domestic flights with the Fokker F27.

In the early 1980s, plans were made to upgrade the airport's facilities. In 1984, Saf (now AdF, the company that manages the airport) was founded, and restructuring work was completed: lengthening (from 1,000 to 1,400 metres) and lighting the runway, installing a VOR/DME navigation system, and rebuilding the airport terminal. In September 1986, regular flights resumed. Since then, the number of airplanes and passengers has steadily increased.

Development since the 1990s

In 1990, the airport was renamed after Florence native Amerigo Vespucci, an Italian merchant and cartographer.

In 1992, the building now dedicated to arrivals, constructed by AdF, was inaugurated. Two years later, a departures building opened, and the City of Florence opened a car park at the entrance to the airport. In 1996, the runway was extended by 250 metres, and AdF funded further enlargement of the departure area. Today, the new area has 15 check-in desks and covers a total of 1,200 square metres, 770 of which are for public use.

Since 9 April 1998, AdF has had a global concession to managing the airport's infrastructure, and it has assumed responsibility for maintenance and development.

On 5 December 2012, Vueling announced the opening of a base of operations in Florence, with flights to several destinations in Europe.

Facilities 

In late 1999, a renovation and expansion of the terminals, aircraft parking areas, and other facilities began. In July 2000, AdF made its debut on the stock market, and in 2001, the airport was among the first in Europe to obtain UNI EN ISO 9001/2000 certification for the quality of its services.

Florence Airport has a single runway, and the main taxiway is situated at the end of Runway 5, with an overshoot/holding area at the end of Runway 23. As is common at smaller airports, after landing, planes turn around at the end of the runway, then taxi back down to reach the parking area and terminal. Because of the close proximity of Monte Morello, planes normally take off from Runway 23, thus forcing aircraft to taxi down the runway again to depart.

The Polizia di Stato stations police helicopters at the airport.

Airlines and destinations 

The following airlines offers scheduled services from and to Florence Airport:

Statistics

Ground transportation
The second line of the Florence light-rail network has a terminal at the airport. The airport is also connected with the city of Florence by a bus line that runs to and from the central railway station every half-hour, operated by Autolinee Toscane. Taxis are available to downtown Florence.

Accidents

References

External links 

 
 
 Airport information (unofficial)

Airfields of the United States Army Air Forces in Italy
Airports established in 1910
Airports in Italy
Transport in Florence